Herbert Pike Pease, 1st Baron Daryngton,  (7 May 1867 – 10 May 1949), was a British politician.

Biography
Pease was born into a wealthy family, the son of the politician Arthur Pease and his wife Mary Lecky née Pike. His brother was (Sir) Arthur Francis Pease. Both were educated at Brighton College. He attended Trinity Hall, Cambridge.

Pease served as Liberal Unionist then Unionist MP for Darlington 1898–1923. For some years he was a party whip. From 1915 until 1922 he was Assistant Postmaster General. He was created a Privy Councillor in 1917.

On 12 February 1923, he was created Baron Daryngton, of Witley in the County of Surrey.

For 25 years he was either Chairman or Vice-Chairman of the House of Laity of the Church Assembly of the Church of England, the predecessor of the General Synod.

The Daryngton peerage passed to the surviving son Jocelyn Arthur Pease, 2nd Baron Daryngton (30 May 1908 – 5 April 1994) on his death, with whom it became extinct.

Marriage and issue
In 1894 he married Alice Luckock; they had two sons and three daughters. Alice died in 1948. Their elder son, Ronald Herbert Pike Pease , was killed on 15 September 1916 during the Battle of the Somme in France. His daughter Ruth Evelyn Pease married Norman Ernest Archer, son of Walter Archer C.B., Assistant Secretary at the government's Board of Agriculture and Fisheries.

References

External links 
 

1867 births
1949 deaths
Barons in the Peerage of the United Kingdom
Herbert
Pease, Herbert
Pease, Herbert
Pease, Herbert
Pease, Herbert
Pease, Herbert
Pease, Herbert
Pease, Herbert
Pease, Herbert
UK MPs who were granted peerages
Alumni of Trinity Hall, Cambridge
Members of the Privy Council of the United Kingdom
Barons created by George V
Church Estates Commissioners